The Athletics competition at the 2009 Lusophone Games was held in the Estádio Universitário de Lisboa on 12,13 and 19 July 2009.

Brazilian medalists Jorge Sena, Bruno Barros, Lucimar Teodoro, Luciana França, Lucimara da Silva, Fernanda Gonçalves, Josiane Tito were all later disqualified from their events as they failed their drug tests after systematic doping by their coach. Triple jump fourth placer Leonardo dos Santos was also disqualified. It is not clear whether medals were reassigned to other athletes.

Medals summary

Men's

Women's

Medal table

Original

After disqualifications

Participation

 (5)
 (54)
 (23)
 (5)
 (6)
 (2)
 (6)
 (2)
 (55)
 (9)
 (9)
 (5)

References

Results
Day 1 results
Day 2 results
LusofG  Lisboa  POR  12 - 13 July. Tilastopaja. Retrieved on 2011-08-20.

Lusophone Games
2009 Lusofonia Games
2009
International athletics competitions hosted by Portugal